Opinion polling on the governorship of Arnold Schwarzenegger began after Schwarzenegger was sworn in as Governor of California in 2003 and ended with his second term expiring in 2011.

Political barometers

References 

Arnold Schwarzenegger
Opinion polling in the United States